2019 Hub accident refers to a road accident on 21 January 2019 in which a passenger bus collided with a tank truck in Hub, Balochistan, Pakistan. At least 26 people were killed and 16 others suffered burn injuries as a result of the accident. The bus was travelling from Karachi to Panjgur with more than 40 people on board. The dead bodies were moved to Edhi Foundation's morgue in Sohrab Goth, Karachi.

A joint investigation team was established to investigate the crash.

References 

2019 disasters in Pakistan
2019 in Balochistan, Pakistan
2019 road incidents
2010s road incidents in Asia 
Bus incidents in Pakistan
Explosions in 2019
Explosions in Balochistan, Pakistan
January 2019 events in Pakistan 
Tanker explosions